J'Michael Deane (born May 4, 1986) is a professional Canadian football offensive lineman. He was drafted 21st overall by the Calgary Stampeders in the 2010 CFL Draft and signed a contract with the team on May 10, 2011 after finishing his college eligibility. He played for three years with the Stampeders before being selected in the 2013 CFL Expansion Draft by the Ottawa Redblacks. He won his first Grey Cup championship in 2016. He played college football for the Michigan State Spartans.

References

External links
Toronto Argonauts bio
Ottawa Redblacks bio 

1987 births
Calgary Stampeders players
Canadian football offensive linemen
Living people
Michigan State Spartans football players
People from Yellowhead County
Players of Canadian football from Alberta
Ottawa Redblacks players
Toronto Argonauts players